The Tick Fire was a wildfire that burned in Los Angeles County, California. The fire broke out on October 24, 2019, and burned several thousand acres. The fire forced the mass evacuation of 40,000 people from the Santa Clarita Valley.

Impact 
The fire in Canyon Country was reported around 1:40 p.m. Thursday, October 24, near the 31600 block of Tick Canyon Road. Initially reported at 200 acres, the blaze rapidly grew to more than 850 acres in less than an hour, fire officials said.

It continued to expand overnight after it jumped State Route 14, closing portions of the highway and forcing additional evacuations in the Sand Canyon area. The blaze had burned nearly 7 square miles by the morning of October 25 and was 5% contained, according to the Los Angeles County Fire Department. Some 10,000 structures were threatened by the fire. 
As of 7 a.m. Saturday October 26, the blaze was 25% contained. Firefighters experienced gusts of winds exceeding 40 miles per hour and temperatures near three digits, which posed a challenge in containing the fire.

Road and Freeway Closures
Tick Canyon Road between Abelia and Summit Knoll was closed.

Soledad Canyon Road and Sand Canyon Road offramps were closed on October 24 and reopened.
State Route 14 North and South off ramps were closed, due to the abrupt and rapid spread of the fires over the freeway.

The blaze also jammed traffic between the Antelope Valley and Los Angeles. The northbound Antelope Valley Freeway (SR 14) was reopened on October 25 as crews continued to battle the fire ahead of an anticipated shift in wind direction.

By 6 a.m. on October 26, firefighters said all road closures would be lifted, except for Baker Canyon and Tick Canyon Road. Other areas such as east of Sand Canyon Road south of Sierra Highway at Linda Vista Street, remained off limits at the time. Meanwhile, the northbound Antelope Valley Freeway, which had been closed between Golden Valley Road and Agua Dulce, was reopened at approximately 4 p.m. October 25. The Sand Canyon Road off-ramp remained closed, along with southbound lanes of the freeway, according to the California Highway Patrol.

School Closures
Due to the intensity of the Santa Ana Winds and multiple fires, many schools and colleges throughout Santa Clarita were closed. These school districts, schools, and colleges included:

Sulphur Springs School District:
Canyon Springs Community School, Fair Oaks Ranch Community School, Golden Oak Community School, Leona Cox Community School, Mint Canyon Community School, Mitchell Community Elementary School, Pinetree Community School, Sulphur Springs Community School, and Valley View Community School.

William S. Hart Union High School District:
Academy of the Canyons High School, Bowman High School, Canyon High School, Castaic High School, Golden Valley High School, Hart High School, Learning Post High School, Saugus High School, Valencia High School, West Ranch High School, Arroyo Seco Junior High School, Le Mesa Junior High School, Placerita Junior High School, Rancho Pico Junior High School, Rio Norte Junior High School, Sierra Vista Junior High School, Golden Oak Adult School, Independent study, and Sequoia School.

Newhall School District:
McGrath Elementary, Meadows Elementary, Newhall Elementary, Oak Hills Elementary, Old Orchard Elementary, Peachland Elementary, Pico Canyon Elementary, Stevenson Ranch Elementary, Valencia Valley Elementary, and Wiley Canyon Elementary.

Saugus Union School District:
Santa Clarita Elementary School, Bridgeport Elementary School, Cedarcreek Elementary School, Emblem Academy, James Foster Elementary School, Charles Helmers Elementary School, Highlands Elementary School, Mountainview Elementary School, Northpark Elementary School, Plum Canyon Elementary School, Rio Vista Elementary School, Rosedell Elementary School, Skyblue Mesa Elementary School, Tesoro Elementary School, and West Creek Academy.

Colleges:
College of the Canyons (Valencia), College of the Canyons (Canyon Country), and California Institute of the Arts (Valencia)

Power Outages
Due to the Tick fire, Southern California Edison preemptively turned off electricity as a preventive measure to reduce the risk of their equipment igniting another fire. On October 24, areas in Santa Clarita that were affected by the power outages included Agua Dulce and Canyon Country, leaving about 26,000 residents without power. Another 380,000 residents were at risk of these power outages.

Evacuation Centers
Evacuation centers were opened for evacuees on October 25.

The gymnasium of College of the Canyons Valencia admitted approximately 400 residents affected by the fires.

West Ranch High School opened to provide shelter to residents as well.

The Castaic Animal Care Center provided shelter for pets, as people searched for and stayed in shelter centers.

Governor Newsom Declares State of Emergency
On October 24, the Governor announced that the state has secured federal Fire Management Assistance Grants to help ensure the availability of resources to fight the Kincade and Tick fires and enable local, state and tribal agencies to recover eligible costs. County Board of Supervisors chair Janice Hahn also issued a local emergency declaration.

A public briefing in Los Angeles was held that day, regarding the ongoing fire threats and the need to hold utilities accountable for the consequences of their decisions to shut off power for large portions of the state.

On October 25, Governor Gavin Newsom issued an emergency proclamation for the counties of Sonoma and Los Angeles due to the effects of the Kincade and Tick fires.

Proclamation of a State of Emergency

WHEREAS beginning on October 23, 2019, a significant wind event struck California, resulting in nearly statewide red flag warnings due to extremely dangerous fire weather conditions; and

WHEREAS on October 23, 2019, the Kincade Fire began burning in Sonoma County; and

WHEREAS on October 24, 2019, the Tick Fire began burning in Los Angeles County; and

WHEREAS these fires have destroyed structures and continue to threaten homes and other structures, necessitating the evacuation of tens of thousands of residents; and

WHEREAS these fires forced the closure of major roadways and are threatening power lines and other critical infrastructure; and

WHEREAS erratic winds, high temperatures, and dry conditions have further increased the spread of these fires; and

WHEREAS the Federal Emergency Management Agency has approved Fire Management Assistance Grants to assist with the mitigation, management, and control of the Kincade Fire and Tick Fire; and

WHEREAS local and state emergency operations centers have been activated; and

WHEREAS under the provisions of Government Code section 8558(b), I find that conditions of extreme peril to the safety of persons and property exist due to the Kincade Fire and Tick Fire in Sonoma County and Los Angeles County, respectively; and

WHEREAS under the provisions of Government Code section 8558(b), I find that the conditions caused by these fires, by reason of their magnitude, are or are likely to be beyond the control of the services, personnel, equipment, and facilities of any single local government and require the combined forces of a mutual aid region or regions to appropriately respond; and

WHEREAS under the provisions of Government Code section 8625(c), I find that local authority is inadequate to cope with the magnitude of the damage caused by these fires; and

WHEREAS under the provisions of Government Code section 8571, I find that strict compliance with various statutes and regulations specified in this order would prevent, hinder, or delay the mitigation of the effects of these fires.

NOW, THEREFORE, I, GAVIN NEWSOM, Governor of the State of California, in accordance with the authority vested in me by the State Constitution and statutes, including the California Emergency Services Act, and in particular, Government Code section 8625, HEREBY PROCLAIM A STATE OF EMERGENCY to exist in Los Angeles and Sonoma counties due to these fires.

IT IS HEREBY ORDERED THAT:

1. All agencies of the state government utilize and employ state personnel, equipment, and facilities for the performance of any and all activities consistent with the direction of the Office of Emergency Services and the State Emergency Plan. Also, all citizens are to heed the advice of emergency officials with regard to this emergency in order to protect their safety.

2. The Office of Emergency Services shall provide local government assistance to Sonoma and Los Angeles counties, if appropriate, under the authority of the California Disaster Assistance Act, Government Code section 8680 et seq., and California Code of Regulations, Title 19, section 2900 et seq.

3. As necessary to assist local governments and for the protection of public health and the environment, state agencies shall enter into contracts to arrange for the procurement of materials, goods, and services necessary to quickly assist with the response to and recovery from the impacts of these fires. Applicable provisions of the Government Code and the Public Contract Code, including but not limited to travel, advertising, and competitive bidding requirements, are suspended to the extent necessary to address the effects of these fires.

4. The provisions of Unemployment Insurance Code section 1253 imposing a one-week waiting period for unemployment insurance applicants are suspended as to all applicants who are unemployed as a direct result of these fires who applied for unemployment insurance benefits during the time period beginning October 23, 2019, and ending on the close of business on April 23, 2020, and who are otherwise eligible for unemployment insurance benefits.

5. Vehicle Code sections 9265(a), 9867, 14901, 14902, and 15255.2, requiring the imposition of fees, are suspended with regard to any request for replacement of a driver's identification card, vehicle registration certificate, or certificate of title, by any individual who lost such records as a result of these fires. Such records shall be replaced without charge.

6. The provisions of Vehicle Code sections 4602 and 5902, requiring the timely registration or transfer of title are suspended with regard to any registration or transfer of title by any resident of Sonoma County or Los Angeles County who is unable to comply with those requirements as a result of these fires. The time covered by this suspension shall not be included in calculating any late penalty pursuant to Vehicle Code section 9554.

7. Health and Safety Code sections 103525.5 and 103625, and Penal Code section 14251, requiring the imposition of fees are hereby suspended with regard to any request for copies of certificates of birth, death, marriage, and dissolution of marriage records, by any individual who lost such records as a result of these fires. Such copies shall be provided without charge.

8. In order to directly respond to the needs of impacted assisted living facilities, adult residential facilities, child care facilities, children's residential facilities, resource family homes, and other similar facilities within the State Department of Social Services’ jurisdiction, the Director of the State Department of Social Services may waive any provisions of the Health and Safety Code or Welfare and Institutions Code, and accompanying regulations or written directives, with respect to the use, licensing, or approval of facilities or homes within the Department's jurisdiction set forth in the California Community Care Facilities Act (Health and Safety Code section 1500 et seq.), the California Child Day Care Facilities Act (Health and Safety Code section 1596.70 et seq.), and the California Residential Care Facilities for the Elderly Act (Health and Safety Code section 1569 et seq.). Any waivers granted pursuant to this paragraph shall be posted on the Department's website and shall only be in effect so long as necessary to address the direct impacts of the fires identified in this proclamation.

I FURTHER DIRECT that as soon as hereafter possible, this proclamation be filed in the Office of the Secretary of State and that widespread publicity and notice be given of this proclamation.

IN WITNESS WHEREOF I have hereunto set my hand and caused the Great Seal of the State of California to be affixed this 25th day of October 2019.

GAVIN NEWSOM

Governor of California

ATTEST:

ALEX PADILLA

Secretary of State

Other Events
Later on October 25, Governor Newsom traveled to Sonoma County to survey areas impacted by the Kincade Fire and meet with emergency responders, residents, health officers and local and state officials.

Affected Communities
More than 4,000 residents in the Northeast Santa Clarita area were evacuated during the Tick Fires. Canyon Country was one of the most affected communities. Mandatory evacuations were located along Tick Canyon Road from Abelia Road to Summit Knoll Road.

Impact on Residents
The power outages caused residents difficulty during escape, as they had to pack belongings in their houses without light. There was difficulty evacuating, as traffic lights were disabled. This, along with road closures caused slow, heavy traffic.

While Santa Clarita families in the urban areas were more easily able to escape, residents on farms had greater difficulty evacuating. One account of a farmer in Canyon Country, Samantha Hull, described evacuating from her farm: "We were running through a pitch-black house trying to grab animals.” Other Santa Clarita farmers let their animals roam free or attempt to hull them into their vehicles and escape.

Impact On Firefighters
As a result of the Tick Fire, there was 1 agency (Partner, Federal, and Local Agencies), 509 total fire personnel assigned, and 8 crews assigned to contain the rapidly spreading fires. Three firefighters were injured, but there were no reported deaths.

Fire Growth and Containment

See also
 2019 California wildfires
Kincade Fire

References

2019 California wildfires
October 2019 events in the United States
Wildfires in Los Angeles County, California